Sotuta is a small town and municipality of the Mexican state of Yucatán, and also was the name of a Mayan chiefdom of the northern central Yucatán Peninsula, before the arrival of the Spanish conquistadors in the sixteenth century.

See also
 Ah Kin Chel
 Ah Canul
 Ceh Pech
 Chakan
 Chetumal

References

Mayan chiefdoms of the Yucatán Peninsula
Populated places in Yucatán

es:Sotuta